Agamudayar (otherwise Agamudaiyar, Akamudayar, Agamudayan) are a Tamil community found in the Indian state of Tamil Nadu. In Southern parts of Tamil Nadu, they are considered as one of the three castes which make up the Mukkulathor community. According to the anthropologist Zoe E Headley, the three communities (Agamudayar, Kallar and Maravar) are the "numerically dominant rural backward castes of the southern districts of Tamil Nadu". Agamudayars are listed in the national commission of backward caste lists for Tamil Nadu as ‘Agamudayar including Thozhu or Thuluva Vellala ’.

Etymology

The term Agamudayar is a Tamil word meaning "House owner" or "Landholder".

Demographics
They are concentrated in Chennai,Villupuram, Tiruvanamalai,Cuddalore,Sivagangai, Ramanathapuram, Thanjavur, Thiruvarur, Nagapattinam, Madurai, Tirunelveli and Pudukkottai districts.

Titles of Agamudayar 

 Thevar
 Servai
Mudaliar
 Pillai
 Desigar
 Udaiyar
 Maniakkarar

Notable people 

 Vijaya Bhaskar
 S. S. Chandran
 P. U. Chinnappa
 V. L. Ethiraj
 S. P. Jananathan
 Kovi Manisekaran
 A. Lakshmanaswami Mudaliar
 Arcot Ramasamy Mudaliar
 C. Natesa Mudaliar
 Pachaiyappa Mudaliar
 V. M. Muralidharan
 Sangili Murugan
 Maruthu Pandiyar
 S. S. Rajendran
 V. Ravichandran
 K. S. Ravikumar
 P. U. Shanmugam
 Simbuthevan
 Thengai Srinivasan
 Kalaipuli S. Thanu
 Sandow M. M. A. Chinnappa Thevar
 Vasanthabalan
 Vivek

References

Mukkulathor
Social groups of Tamil Nadu